Argyrolobium uniflorum is a wild pluriannual herbaceous species of drought tolerant legume found in arid regions of Northern Africa sometimes described as pseudo-savannah.  A. uniflorum  is a hardy wild species of plant and it is considered a valuable forage crop for agriculture in Africa. It is also useful as a potentially important species in bioremediation and dryland restoration in arid regions of Tusinia which are sensitive to misappropriation and overgrazing.

Morphology 
Argyrolobium uniflorum has been described as a dwarf flowering shrub with stems 10-18 inches long, with infolded leaflets, solitary flowers flowers opposite the leaf.

Distribution 
Argyrolobium uniflorum is found in South Africa along the Berg River and on the Vanstaadensberg mountain range and uncommonly in Albany Africa. Recent examples of the species in Europe in South Eastern Spain and are considered an emerging plant in these areas.

Symbiosis 
Argyrolobium uniflorum is a symbiosis competent legume. It is capable of nodule formation and nitrogen fixing symbiosis with species of alphaproteobacteria.

References 

Genisteae
Flora of North Africa
Taxa named by Joseph Decaisne